Donna Rowland Barrett (born June 5, 1969, in Shelbyville, Tennessee) is a former Republican member of the State Representative in the Tennessee General Assembly for the 34th House District in Rutherford County, Tennessee. She served as the State Representative from that area from 2000 to 2010.

Biography
She attended Middle Tennessee State University. She is married to Ronnie Barrett, CEO of Barrett Firearms.

Public service 
In 1998, Barrett unsuccessfully ran against incumbent Representative Mary Ann Eckles for the 49th District House Seat, receiving  48% of the vote. In 2006, she ran a successful campaign against Mary Ann Eckles. She served in the Tennessee House of Representatives from 2000 to 2010. She was a member of the Finance, Ways and Means Committee, the Children and Family Affairs Committee, and the Consumer and Employee Affairs Committee. She also served on the powerful Fiscal Review Committee, overseeing government spending for the state. In 2005 she was awarded the "Taxpayer Hero Award" by Tennessee Tax Revolt, Inc.

In April 2010 she was one of five persons added to the governing body of the Tennessee Center for Policy Research (TCPR).

References

External links
Donna Rowland's Profile on the Tennessee General Assembly Information Page   
Donna Rowland's Campaign/Constituent Website

1969 births
Living people
People from Shelbyville, Tennessee
People from Rutherford County, Tennessee
Republican Party members of the Tennessee House of Representatives
Women state legislators in Tennessee
21st-century American women